Philippe de Carteret II, 3rd Seigneur of Sark (18 February 1584 – 22 August 1643) was the son of Philippe de Carteret I (1552–1594) and Rachel Paulett (1564–1650), daughter of George Paulett (1534–1621) who was Bailiff of Jersey from 1583 to 1611, and his wife Elizabeth Perrin (1538–1615).

Biography
He matriculated at the University of Oxford at an early age in 1594, the same year he succeeded his father as Seigneur of Sark.
He was knighted in 1617, and became Bailiff of Jersey in 1627.
He died in 1643, being succeeded in the Seigneurie by his son, Philippe 4th Seigneur of Sark.

English Civil War
Carteret was a stanch Royalist during the English Civil War, especially during the Interregnum. As Lieutenant Governor of the island of Jersey he would ensure the loyalty of the population to Charles II and crack down on parliamentary sentiment from the fortress of Mont Orgueil.

When Charles II came to Jersey Philip Carteret along with his cousin George Carteret were his escorts.

Family

Carteret married Anne Dowse (1587-1664), daughter of Sir Francis Dowse (died 1649) of Nether Wallop, Hampshire and his wife Elizabeth Paulet (died before 1649) They had seven sons and three daughters:

 Sir Philip Carteret, 1st Baronet (c. 1620-1662), who succeeded him, and was father of Philippe de Carteret IV.
 Peyton (died September 1652), drowned with Prince Maurice.
 Zouch.
 Gideon (died 1643).
 Francis (died 1693), Attorney-General of Jersey, married Anne Seale (died c. 1704). Among their descendants were Elias Dumaresq V, Seigneur of Augres , General Sir Tomkyns Hilgrove Turner and Bodleian Librarian Bulkeley Bandinel.
 Thomas de Carteret.
 Sir Edward (died 1699).
 Elizabeth (died 1697), married her cousin, Sir George Carteret.
 Margaret.
 Anne de Carteret (died 1708), married Rev. Daniel Brevint, Dean of Lincoln (1616-1695).

Ancestry

Notes

References

Further reading
 — contains an biographical entry for this man

1584 births
1643 deaths
Philippe de Carteret II
People from Sark
Bailiffs of Jersey